Deltochilum is a genus of dung beetles in the family Scarabaeidae. There are at least 100 described species in Deltochilum.

See also
 List of Deltochilum species

References

External links

 
 

Scarabaeidae genera
Deltochilini